Marcus Garrett (born November 9, 1998) is an American professional basketball player for the Sioux Falls Skyforce of the NBA G League. He played college basketball for the Kansas Jayhawks.

Early life and high school career
Garrett began playing basketball at the age of four. He grew up playing basketball, soccer and baseball but mainly focused on football. However, he quit football after breaking his right leg in sixth grade. As a result, Garrett shifted his attention to basketball and began being coached by his uncle and former San Diego State basketball player, Matt Watts. In eighth grade, he joined Watts' Amateur Athletic Union (AAU) team, Swag House, with whom he competed against high school juniors and seniors. 

Garrett played for Skyline High School in Dallas, Texas and grew from 6'2" as a freshman. In his senior season, he averaged 17.3 points, 10.4 rebounds, 9.1 assists, 3.1 steals and 2.9 blocks per game, leading his team to the Class 6A state semifinals and earning Texas Gatorade Player of the Year honors. Garrett was a consensus four-star recruit and one of the top-ranked prospects from Texas in the 2017 class. He committed to playing college basketball for Kansas over Texas and Baylor, among others.

College career
In his freshman season at Kansas, Garrett averaged 4.1 points, 3.4 rebounds and 1.1 assists in 19.2 minutes per game. He emerged as a defensive specialist for the Jayhawks but was deemed their "weak link" on the offensive end as he was not a good three-point shooter. On November 13, 2017, he shared Big 12 Conference Newcomer of the Week honors with Mohamed Bamba, after posting 10 points and 10 rebounds in a 92–56 win over Tennessee State. In his sophomore season, Garrett improved as a decision-maker, which helped him earn more playing time. He missed six games in February 2019 with a high ankle sprain. At the end of the season, Garrett was named to the Big 12 All-Defensive Team after averaging 7.3 points, 4.2 rebounds and 1.4 steals per game. On February 15, 2020, Garrett scored a career-high 24 points with six three-pointers, five rebounds, seven assists and four steals in an 87–70 win over Oklahoma. As a junior, he averaged 9.2 points, 4.6 assists, 4.5 rebounds and 1.8 steals per game and started in all 31 games. He was named Big 12 Defensive Player of the Year while also earning All-Defensive and third-team All-Big 12 accolades. On April 1, 2020, Garrett was named the Naismith Defensive Player of the Year Award winner. As a senior, he averaged 11 points, 4.6 rebounds, 3.7 assists and 1.6 steals per game. Garrett was named to the Second Team All-Big 12 and the Big 12 All-Defensive Team. On April 21, 2021, he declared for the 2021 NBA draft, forgoing his extra year of college eligibility.

Professional career

Miami Heat (2021–2022)
After going undrafted in the 2021 NBA draft, Garrett joined the Miami Heat for the 2021 NBA Summer League. On September 2, 2021, he signed a two-way contract with the Heat. Under the terms of the deal, he split time between the Heat and their NBA G League affiliate, the Sioux Falls Skyforce. On January 16, 2022, Garrett was waived by the Heat.

On July 16, 2022, Garrett re-signed with the Heat on a two-way contract. He was waived on October 13 after he fractured his wrist.

Sioux Falls Skyforce (2022–present)
On October 24, 2022, Garrett rejoined the Sioux Falls Skyforce roster for training camp.

Career statistics

NBA

|-
| style="text-align:left;"| 
| style="text-align:left;"| Miami
| 12 || 0 || 10.7 || .238 || .250 || .400 || 1.9 || .6 || .4 || .3 || 1.1
|- class="sortbottom"
| style="text-align:center;" colspan="2"| Career
| 12 || 0 || 10.7 || .238 || .250 || .400 || 1.9 || .6 || .4 || .3 || 1.1

College

|-
| style="text-align:left;"| 2017–18
| style="text-align:left;"| Kansas
| 39 || 7 || 19.2 || .456 || .267 || .490 || 3.4 || 1.1 || .9 || .2 || 4.1
|-
| style="text-align:left;"| 2018–19
| style="text-align:left;"| Kansas
| 30 || 13 || 27.9 || .422 || .245 || .587 || 4.2 || 1.9 || 1.4 || .3 || 7.3
|-
| style="text-align:left;"| 2019–20
| style="text-align:left;"| Kansas
| 31 || 31 || 32.2 || .442 || .327 || .609 || 4.5 || 4.6 || 1.8 || .3 || 9.2
|-
| style="text-align:left;"| 2020–21
| style="text-align:left;"| Kansas
| 29 || 29 || 33.0 || .459 || .348 || .808 || 4.6 || 3.7 || 1.6 || .3 || 11.0
|- class="sortbottom"
| style="text-align:center;" colspan="2"| Career
|| 129 || 80 || 27.4 || .445 || .302 || .635 || 4.1 || 2.7 || 1.4 || .3 || 7.6

References

External links
Kansas Jayhawks bio

1998 births
Living people
American men's basketball players
Basketball players from Dallas
Kansas Jayhawks men's basketball players
Miami Heat players
Point guards
Sioux Falls Skyforce players
Undrafted National Basketball Association players